This article lists events from the 1590s in Scotland.

Incumbents
Monarch of Scotland
James VI (1567–1625)
Duke of Rothesay, Prince and Great Steward of Scotland, etc.
Henry Frederick Stuart (1594–1612)

Events

1590
Entry and coronation of Anne of Denmark.
The North Berwick witch trials begin.

1592
Margaret Vinstarr plans the escape of her lover John Wemyss of Logie from Dalkeith Palace.

1594
The christening of Prince Henry is celebrated at Stirling Castle with a tournament, a feast, and a masque.

1597
King James VI publishes his Daemonologie, detailing his reflections and studies on the matter of how to deal with witchcraft.

1598
William Schaw issues the first of the Schaw Statutes of masonry, the Second Statute following in 1599.

References

 
1590 in Scotland
1591 in Scotland
1592 in Scotland
1593 in Scotland
1594 in Scotland
1595 in Scotland
1596 in Scotland
1597 in Scotland
1598 in Scotland
1599 in Scotland